The ZiS-2 (GRAU index: 52-P-271) is a Soviet 57 mm anti-tank gun used during World War II.  The ZiS-4 is a version of the gun that was meant to be installed in tanks. ZiS stands for Zavod imeni Stalina (Russian Завод имени Сталина, 'Factory named after Stalin'), the official title of Artillery Factory No. 92, which produced the gun first.

Development
In the beginning of 1940 the design office of V. G. Grabin received a task from the artillery department to develop a powerful anti-tank gun. The head of this department, Marshal Kulik, and his subordinates estimated that the use of heavily armoured tanks by the USSR in the Winter War would not have gone unnoticed in Nazi Germany and would lead to the development of similar fighting machines there. There is also a chance that the department was influenced by German propaganda about the experimental multi-turreted "supertank" NbFz, ie. heavier armour was attributed to this vehicle than it actually carried. Therefore, Grabin and his office were guided by the characteristics of their own domestic heavy tank KV-1 with 40–75 mm armour. In the opinion of the designers the optimal calibre in this case was 57 mm. The velocity and mass of the armour-piercing 57 mm projectile allowed it to attain sufficient kinetic energy to penetrate up to 90 mm of RHA  while keeping the gun sufficiently light, mobile and easy to conceal. However, the decision also had a downside: this calibre was a new one to the Red Army so the manufacturing of the projectile had to be started from scratch.

Development started in May 1940, and in the beginning of 1941 the gun was adopted as the 57 mm anti-tank gun model 1941 (Russian: 57-мм противотанковая пушка образца 1941 года), abbreviated ZiS-2 (ЗиС-2). Production began on 1 June 1941, but on 1 December 1941 it was stopped by marshals N. N. Voronov and G. L. Govorov, their explanation being that ZiS-2 shells penetrated straight through weakly-armoured German tanks from one side to the other without doing much damage internally. Other possible reasons for the decision were the high cost of the gun and problems with shell production. By that time 371 pieces had been built.

The production lines were switched to manufacturing of the ZiS-3 76.2 mm divisional gun while Soviet anti-tank artillery received cheaper 45 mm guns. Some anti-tank regiments also received the ZiS-3 which was able to defeat any German vehicle until late 1942.

The appearance of the heavy Tiger I and then the Panther changed the balance in favour of the Germans. Forty-five millimetre model 1942 guns could only pierce the side armour of the Panther while the ZiS-3 managed to penetrate the sides from greater distances. Against the Tiger the ZiS-3 was effective  from the side only at close ranges (up to 300 m) and the 45 mm pieces were nearly useless. A more powerful gun was needed, and on 15 June 1943, the ZiS-2 once again entered service as the 57 mm anti-tank gun model 1943. Until 1945, 9,645 units were produced.

Description
The ZiS-2 is an automated-action gun with a vertical block breech. When firing the block opens and closes automatically, the loader only has to put a round into the receiver. Due to this feature the rate of fire can reach 25 rounds per minute. The split-trail carriage with gunshield was shared with the ZiS-3 divisional gun. The gun can also be attached to a limber and towed by a team of six horses. ZiS-2s are equipped with PP1–2 panoramic sights.

Service
ZiS-2s were employed by anti-tank artillery platoons of infantry units and by anti-tank artillery units of the reserve of high command, the most numerous of these being anti-tank artillery regiments (Russian Истребительный Противотанковый Артиллерийский Полк, abbreviated ИПТАП).  Guns captured by the Germans were given the designation 5.7 cm Pak 208(r).

Self-propelled mounts

The ZiS-2 was also mounted on a few vehicles. In 1941 about one-hundred ZiS-2 guns were mounted on Komsomolets armoured tractor chassis to create the ZiS-30 tank destroyer.

The ZiS-2 gun was also mounted in at least three different prototypes based on the SU-76 assault gun (SU-74, SU-76D, and SU-57B). None were accepted for production.

There was also a tank gun version of ZiS-2 called ZiS-4. In 1941, in an attempt to improve the anti-tank performance of the T-34 tank members of the Morozov Design Bureau experimentally equipped it with the ZiS-4. Only a small number of these T-34-57 tanks were built and used as tank hunters. The idea resurfaced in 1943 after the Battle of Kursk because Germany fielded heavily armoured Tiger and Panther tanks. Only a limited number of the T-34 equipped with a slightly modified version of the ZiS-4M gun with a new breech to simplify production were produced. Although the high-velocity gun had superior armour penetration to the F-34 the small weight of its shell meant that it could not fire an adequate high-explosive round for general use. The ultimate solution for the tank was to design a new turret allowing the use of an 85 mm gun; the new model was called the T-34-85.

A modernised version of the ZiS-2 was used in a post-war self-propelled airborne antitank gun known as the ASU-57,

Post-war history

Due to improvements in tank armour protection the ZiS-2 quickly lost its anti-tank value. In Soviet anti-tank artillery forces by the mid-1950s, the ZiS-2 was replaced by a more powerful 100 mm gun. However, its small size and weight kept it in active service with Soviet airborne troops for much longer.

On 15 July 2013 a North Korean cargo ship, the Chong Chon Gang, was intercepted smuggling weapons from Cuba while transiting the Panama Canal. Following a board-and-search operation by Panamanian security forces, it was discovered to be carrying ZiS-2 ammunition among other older Soviet-made weaponry, indicating that some examples remain in continuing use by North Korean forces. Until this incident, Namibia was believed to be the last operator of the ZiS-2; the Namibian Defence Force having continued to operate  six examples well into the 1990s. Although no longer in active service, ZiS-2s remained in storage as part of the reserve stocks of various national armies as late as 2008.

Versions
 ZiS-2 – Basic version.
 ZiS-4 – Tank gun version.

Ammunition

Armour penetration

Weapons of comparable role, performance and era
 Ordnance QF 6-pounder: British anti-tank gun

See also
 76 mm divisional gun M1942 (ZiS-3)

References
Notes

Bibliography
 Shunkov V. N. - The Weapons of the Red Army, Mn. Harvest, 1999 (Шунков В. Н. - Оружие Красной Армии. — Мн.: Харвест, 1999.) 
 Zaloga, Steven J., James Grandsen (1984). Soviet Tanks and Combat Vehicles of World War Two, pp. 164–5, 180.  London: Arms and Armour Press. .

External links

 FlamesOfWar
 Mac.distribution.cz
 Aviapress 
 Easyget.narod.ru 
 Ammunition data on BattleField.Ru 
 T-34-57 on BattleField.Ru
 "Russian Hetzers" on Henk.fox3000.com

World War II artillery of the Soviet Union
Anti-tank guns of the Soviet Union
World War II anti-tank guns
World War II tank guns
57 mm artillery
Tank guns
Nizhny Novgorod Machine-building Plant products
Weapons and ammunition introduced in 1941